Colgan Air Flight 9446 was a repositioning flight operated by Colgan Air for US Airways Express. Both pilots were killed.

Aircraft and crew

Flight 9446 was an unscheduled deadhead flight of a Beechcraft 1900D (registration ). The aircraft had just finished receiving maintenance and was being repositioned to Albany, New York to return to revenue service. The two occupants of the plane were its pilots, Captain Scott Knabe (39) and First Officer Steven Dean (38). Captain Knabe had been with Colgan Air for two years and had 2,891 flight hours, including 1,364 hours on the Beechcraft 1900. Dean had been with the airline for less than a year and had 2,489 flight hours, 689 of which were on the Beechcraft 1900.

Accident
Flight 9446 departed Barnstable Municipal Airport on August 26, 2003, at 15:40 EDT. Shortly after takeoff, the crew declared an emergency and reported a trim problem. The pilots requested a return to Barnstable, and air traffic control cleared the flight to land on any runway. The airplane continued its left turn in a nose-up attitude, and then pitched down and crashed into water near the airport.

Investigation and aftermath
The National Transportation Safety Board (NTSB) investigated the accident. 

The NTSB determined that Flight 9446 was the first flight after maintenance personnel had replaced the forward elevator trim cable. The maintenance personnel had skipped a step in the maintenance process. In addition, the aircraft maintenance manual depicted the elevator trim drum backwards. As a result, the trim system was configured in a manner that caused the trim tabs in the cockpit to move in the correct direction. However, the actual trim wheel (which controlled the flight control surfaces) moved in the opposite direction. 

The NTSB also determined that the pilots did not notice the maintenance error because the captain failed to perform a preflight checklist, which included an elevator trim check. The pilots manually set nose-up trim prior to departure. However, because of the improper maintenance, this set the elevator trim to the full nose-down position.

The NTSB determined that it would have taken 250 pounds of force on the control yoke for the pilots to keep the plane airborne, making a safe landing nearly impossible. Investigators programmed a flight simulator with the improper trim settings and made six simulated flights. Five attempts resulted in crashes shortly after takeoff; in one attempt, the simulator pilot could circle for a landing but impacted terrain while attempting to land. 

The NTSB published its findings and determination of probable cause on August 31, 2004. The NTSB determined that the probable causes of the accident were the maintenance crew's improper replacement of the forward elevator trim cable and the subsequent inadequate functional check of the maintenance performed. The NTSB also identified the flight crew's failure to follow the checklist procedures and the aircraft manufacturer's erroneous depiction of the elevator trim drum in the maintenance manual as contributing to the accident.

After the NTSB's final report was published, Aero News Network observed that Beechcraft 1900D maintenance manuals were considered accident factors in two previous fatal accidents. However, Raytheon, the owner of Beechcraft, denied blame for the crash of Flight 9446, and a company spokesman said that the accident would not have happened without the Colgan Air maintenance crew's mistakes.

References
Notes

Sources

External links 

 NTSB investigation docket
 Cockpit Voice Recorder transcript and accident summary

Aviation accidents and incidents in the United States in 2003
Airliner accidents and incidents in Massachusetts
Accidents and incidents involving the Beechcraft 1900
9446
Aviation accidents and incidents in Massachusetts
Yarmouth, Massachusetts
History of Barnstable County, Massachusetts
2003 in Massachusetts
Airliner accidents and incidents caused by maintenance errors
Airliner accidents and incidents caused by pilot error